Collectif Métissé is a French musical group with influences ranging from zouk to ragga. They became famous with "Laisse-toi aller bébé" that reached number two in the summer of 2009, becoming a big summer hit.

Members
Soma Riba, DJ and singer who had released hits like "Yaka dansé" in 2004 and "Vacances j'oublie tout", a remake of "Femme libérée" in 2005. He is the songwriter for the group.
DJ Fou (real name Sébastien Santovito) known for his 1999 hit "Je mets le Wai", with a mix of ragga and makina. He has a solo album Nyctalopie with 23 electro-danse tunes. He also has collaborations with Soma Riba and DJs at many venues
Nadia Lahcene, a French singer of Moroccan origin, a vocalist of the group. 
Willy William, a Mauritian-French DJ also known for his many remixes with Big Ali
Yannick Cotte, a singer from Réunion
Amélie Wade
Saint Ange, the last to join in

Discography

Albums

Singles

References

External links
Official website

French reggae musical groups
Musical collectives
Musical groups established in 2009
Musical groups from Nouvelle-Aquitaine